Sylwester Glacier is a glacier, 5 miles (8 km) long, flowing north between Jacobs Nunatak and MacAlpine Hills into Law Glacier. Named by Advisory Committee on Antarctic Names (US-ACAN) for David L. Sylwester, United States Antarctic Research Program (USARP) aurora scientist at South Pole Station, winter 1961, and Byrd Station, summer, 1961–62.

Glaciers of Oates Land